The Sheikh Mohamed bin Khalifa Mosque is a mosque in Bel Air, Victoria, Seychelles.

History
The mosque was built in September 1982, making it the first mosque in the country. In 2013, it underwent renovation.

Architecture
The mosque features a golden dome. It has a capacity of 600 worshipers.

See also
 Islam in Seychelles

References

1982 establishments in Seychelles
Buildings and structures in Victoria, Seychelles
Islam in Seychelles
Mosques completed in 1982
Religious buildings and structures in Seychelles